The 1963 Hamilton Tiger-Cats finished in 1st place in the Eastern Conference with a 10–4 record and won the Grey Cup over the BC Lions.

Preseason

Regular season

Season Standings

Season schedule

Playoffs

Schedule

Grey Cup

References

Hamilton Tiger-cats Season, 1963
Hamilton Tiger-Cats seasons
James S. Dixon Trophy championship seasons
Grey Cup championship seasons
Hamilton Tiger-Cats